The Roman Catholic Archdiocese of San Juan de Cuyo is a Latin rite metropolitan diocese in Argentina.
 
Its archiepiscopal seat is San Juan Cathedral, dedicated to Saint John the Baptist, in San Juan, Argentina.

History
 In 1826 Pope Leo XII founded the see as the Apostolic Vicariate of San Juan de Cuyo on territory taken from the Diocese of Córdoba del Tucumán.
 Pope Gregory XVI elevated it to a diocese on 19 September 1834. 
 On 20 April 1934 it was elevated to a Metropolitan Archdiocese of San Juan de Cuyo / Sancti Ioannis de Cuyo (Latin)  by Pope Pius XI . On the same date it lost territory to create the dioceses of Mendoza and the suffragan Diocese of San Luis.

Statistics 
As per 2014, it pastorally served 638,183 Catholics (91.0% of 701,000 total) on 89,615 km² in 43 parishes and 216 missions with 96 priests (80 diocesan, 16 religious), 8 deacons, 85 lay religious (17 brothers, 68 sisters) and 21 seminarians.

Ecclesiastical province 
The Metropolitan's suffragan sees are :
 Roman Catholic Diocese of La Rioja 
 Roman Catholic Diocese of San Luis

Bishops

Ordinaries

Apostolic Vicar of San Juan de Cuyo
 Justo Santa María de Oro, O.P. (O.P.) (1828-1834)

Bishops of San Juan de Cuyo
 Justo Santa María de Oro, O.P. (1834-1836)
 José Manuel Eufrasio de Quiroga Sarmiento (1837-1852)
 Nicolás Aldazor, O.F.M. (1858-1866)
 Venceslao Javier José Achával y Medina, O.F.M. (1867-1898)
 Marcellino Benavente, O.P. (1899-1910)
 José Américo Orzali (1911-1934)

Archbishops of San Juan de Cuyo
 José Américo Orzali (1934-1939)
 Audino Rodríguez y Olmos (1939-1965)
 Ildefonso Maria Sansierra Robla, O.F.M. Cap. (1966-1980)
 Ítalo Severino Di Stéfano (1980-2000)
 Alfonso Delgado Evers (2000-2017)
 Jorge Eduardo Lozano (2017-present)

Coadjutor archbishop
Jorge Eduardo Lozano (2016-2017)

Auxiliary Bishops of San Juan de Cuyo
 José Hilarión de Etura y Cevallos (Ceballos), O.P. (1839-1849)
 José Benito Salvador de la Reta, O.F.M. (1881-1897)
 Juan José Marcos Zapata (1913-1951)
Leonardo Gregorio Gallardo Heredia (1960-1961)
Ildefonso Maria Sansierra Robla, O.F.M. Cap.  (1962-1966), appointed Archbishop here
Carlos María Domínguez, O.A.R. (2019-)

Other priests of this diocese who became bishops
Silvino Martínez, appointed Auxiliary Bishop of Rosario in 1946
Enrique Pechuán Marín, appointed Bishop of Cruz del Eje in 1963

See also 
 List of Catholic dioceses in Argentina

References

Sources and external links 
 GCatholic, with Google map - data for all sections

Roman Catholic dioceses in Argentina
Roman Catholic Ecclesiastical Province of San Juan
Roman Catholic dioceses and prelatures established in the 19th century
1826 establishments in Argentina
Religious organizations established in 1826